Château de Beaurepaire is a château on the D138 road between Montreuil and Campagne-les-Hesdin in the Pas-de-Calais, France.

It housed the British Expeditionary Force's General Headquarters during World War I from April 1916 to April 1919, and was the command headquarters in this period of Field Marshal Sir Douglas Haig.

References

Châteaux in Pas-de-Calais